The Domino Day 2005 house sparrow, generally known as the domino sparrow was a house sparrow (Passer domesticus) that was shot and killed by a hunter from the company Duke Faunabeheer in the Frisian Expo Centre in Leeuwarden, Netherlands, during preparations for Domino Day 2005 on 14 November 2005. With only four days to go until Domino Day 2005, the bird flew into the building and landed on several domino bricks, eventually causing 23,000 of them (out of 4.3 million) to fall. Because of the protective gaps that were placed between groups of dominoes, the damage was limited. Faunabeheer was hired to remove the unwanted intruder from the centre. After trying to capture the sparrow with nets and sticks, the company decided to shoot the bird.

Controversy
The Dierenbescherming, a large animal protection organisation, went to court against Faunabeheer and the production company Endemol for their actions against the domino sparrow. The public prosecutor fined the shooter 200 euros for illegally killing an animal belonging to a protected species.

After several Dutch newspapers and television stations announced what had happened in the Frisian Expo Centre, several animal rights organisations, popular blogs like GeenStijl and radio DJs like Ruud de Wild devoted time and attention to the subject. They claimed that killing an animal in order to save a television show is a low deed, and accused the shooter of having no respect for animal life. De Wild said that he was willing to give a €3,000 reward to anyone who toppled the dominoes before the start of the event. However, nobody was able to do this since the security around the Frisian Expo Centre tightened following the sparrow incident and death threats against Faunabeheer, SBS Broadcasting, and Endemol.

A month after the sparrow's death, the Dutch Public Prosecutor handed the bird over to the Natuurhistorisch Museum in Rotterdam, as requested by its curator Kees Moeliker. The museum stuffed the dead bird and displayed it in an exhibition on the house sparrow from November 2006 until May 2007. The bird was subsequently moved to an exhibition containing dead animals with a backstory.

In 2019, it was reported that even almost a decade and a half after the incident, the hunter who killed the bird still received threats to his life.

See also
 List of individual birds

References

Individual songbirds
2005 animal deaths
2005 in the Netherlands
Individual animals in the Netherlands
Individual wild animals